Hetty Benbridge (died 1776) (also known as Esther Benbridge, Hetty Sage, or Letticia Benbridge) was an American painter of miniature portraits.

Biography 
Esther "Hetty" Benbridge (née Sage) was from Philadelphia, Pennsylvania. She studied with painter Charles Willson Peale. Peale's influence can be seen in the long oval faces of her portrait subjects.

She married fellow portrait painter Henry Benbridge in early 1772 and they had one son, also named Henry, who was born on December 13, 1772. In April 1773 she moved with her mother and the baby to join her husband in Charleston, South Carolina, where he had established a portrait studio. She was mentioned in the April 5 edition of the South Carolina Gazette as "a very ingenious Miniature Paintress" who had arrived that week from Philadelphia. Hetty Benbridge is thought to have died in 1776.

There are ten extant miniatures attributed to her, although none of the attributed paintings bear her signature. All are painted in watercolor on ivory and set in small gold lockets. Eight of the portraits are of women, including eighteen-year-old Anne Wragg Ferguson, and one depicts a child. The tenth portrait is of a South Carolinian man, John Poage.

References

External links 
 Attributed painting of John Poage in the National Gallery Portrait Records.
 Attributed painting of Sarah Wood Purcell via Tennessee Society of Colonial Dames

1776 deaths
18th-century American painters
Artists from Philadelphia
American women painters
American portrait painters
Portrait miniaturists
Painters from Pennsylvania
Artists from Charleston, South Carolina
Painters from South Carolina
18th-century American women artists